Belmont-sur-Montreux railway station is a railway station in the municipality of Montreux, in the Swiss canton of Vaud. It is located on the   Montreux–Lenk im Simmental line of the Montreux Oberland Bernois Railway.

Services
 the following services stop at Belmont-sur-Montreux:

References

External links
 
 

Montreux
Railway stations in the canton of Vaud
Montreux Oberland Bernois Railway stations